The 1989 Fresno State Bulldogs football team represented California State University, Fresno as a member of the Big West Conference during the 1989 NCAA Division I-A football season. Led by 12th-year head coach Jim Sweeney, Fresno State compiled an overall record of 11–1 with a mark of 7–0 in conference play, winning the Big West title for the second consecutive season. The Bulldogs played their home games at Bulldog Stadium in Fresno, California.

Fresno State earned their fourth NCAA Division I-A postseason bowl game berth in 1989. They played the Mid-American Conference (MAC) champion Ball State Cardinals in the ninth annual California Bowl at Bulldog Stadium on December 9. The Bulldogs won their third consecutive bowl game by beating Ball State, 27–6.

Schedule

Team players in the NFL
The following were selected in the 1990 NFL Draft.

The following finished their college career in 1989, were not drafted, but played in the NFL.

References

Fresno State
Fresno State Bulldogs football seasons
Big West Conference football champion seasons
Fresno State Bulldogs football